"Hip Hop Bommi Bop" is a parody hip hop version of the Die Toten Hosen song "Eisgekühlter Bommerlunder". The song was born with the cooperation with Fab Five Freddy and is one of the first German hip hop songs.

A remix of the song ("Tap into America-Mix") was released on Auf dem Kreuzzug ins Glück. It features a more aggressive part for Die Toten Hosen. This version was also added to the greatest hits album Reich & sexy.

Music video
The video depicts the band and Fab Five Freddy in a situation, where the band members are cannibalistic natives and Freddy is in their cauldron, being cooked and singing the song.

Track listing
 "Hip Hop Bommi Bop" (Breitkopf, Frege, von Holst, Meurer, Trimpop/Meurer, Trimpop) − 4:25
 "Hip Hop Bommi Bop Bop" − 6:47

1983 singles
1983 songs
Die Toten Hosen songs
Songs written by Andreas von Holst
Songs written by Campino (singer)
Songs written by Fab Five Freddy
Songs written by Michael Breitkopf